Salomin  is a village in the administrative district of Gmina Gościeradów, within Kraśnik County, Lublin Voivodeship, in eastern Poland.

Long distance observations

This is one village in Lubelskie Voivodship and extremely north east place, from where the Tatra Mountains are visible during the extremely favourable weather conditions. These mountains has been captured on spring 2018. The distance in a line of sight to Tatra Mountains is 229 km.

References

Salomin